That's Right is the final single released by Three 6 Mafia from their July 19, 2008 studio album Last 2 Walk. It features Akon, and in the music video version, Jim Jones.

Music video
A music video was released, it featured the group with Akon, but the song also featured a verse from Jim Jones that wasn't on the album.

Charts

References

2008 singles
Three 6 Mafia songs
Akon songs
Song recordings produced by Akon
Jim Jones (rapper) songs
Songs written by Juicy J
Songs written by Akon
Songs written by DJ Paul
Songs written by Giorgio Tuinfort